
Gmina Chorzele is an urban-rural gmina (administrative district) in Przasnysz County, Masovian Voivodeship, in east-central Poland.

Villages
Apart from the town of Chorzele, Gmina Chorzele contains the villages and settlements of: 
 
 Aleksandrowo
 Annowo
 Bagienice
 Binduga
 Bobry
 Bogdany Małe
 Bogdany Wielkie
 Brzeski-Kołaki
 Budki
 Bugzy Płoskie
 Bugzy-Jarki
 Bugzy-Święchy
 Czaplice Wielkie
 Czaplice-Furmany
 Czaplice-Piłaty
 Czarzaste Małe
 Czarzaste Wielkie
 Dąbrowa
 Dąbrówka Ostrowska
 Duczymin
 Dzierzęga-Nadbory
 Gadomiec-Chrzczany
 Gadomiec-Miłocięta
 Gadomiec-Peronie
 Grąd Rycicki
 Jarzynny Kierz
 Jedlinka
 Krukowo
 Krzynowłoga Wielka
 Kwiatkowo
 Łaz
 Łazy
 Lipowiec
 Liwki
 Mącice
 Niskie Wielkie
 Nowa Wieś koło Duczymina
 Nowa Wieś Zarębska
 Opaleniec
 Opiłki Płoskie
 Poścień-Wieś
 Poścień-Zamion
 Pruskołęka
 Przątalina
 Przysowy
 Rapaty-Górki
 Rapaty-Sulimy
 Rapaty-Żachy
 Raszujka
 Rawki
 Rembielin
 Rycice
 Rzodkiewnica
 Ścięciel
 Skuze
 Sosnówek
 Stara Wieś
 Wasiły-Zygny
 Wierzchowizna
 Wólka Zdziwójska
 Zagaty
 Zaręby
 Zdziwój Nowy
 Zdziwój Stary

Neighbouring gminas
Gmina Chorzele is bordered by the gminas of Baranowo, Czarnia, Dzierzgowo, Janowo, Jednorożec, Krzynowłoga Mała and Wielbark.

References

Polish official population figures 2006

Chorzele
Przasnysz County